Louise Marie Amélie Faivre (February 4, 1837 - November 17, 1897) was a French mezzo-soprano.

Born in Paris, the daughter of François-Théodore Faivre (1799-1861), a trombonist with the Théâtre-Italien, and Julie-Coralie Bolot (1814-1883), Faivre studied at the Conservatoire de Paris, where in 1857 she received third prize in singing and second in the field of opéra-comique. A career singer at the Théâtre Lyrique, at which she debuted in 1857 in Euryanthe by Carl Maria von Weber, she ultimately rose to become principal dugazon of that company, for which she created a number of roles. For la Monnaie she was the first Fatima in Oberon by Weber. Faivre was the sister of Marie Faivre, also a singer. With her husband, Charles Réty, she was the mother of Marie Madeleine Emilie Réty, known as Bernerette Gandrey, a singer as well. Faivre died at home in the 17th arrondissement of Paris, and was buried at Père Lachaise Cemetery.

References

1837 births
1897 deaths
French operatic mezzo-sopranos
19th-century French women opera singers
Singers from Paris
Conservatoire de Paris alumni
Burials at Père Lachaise Cemetery